Joe Goodchild (born 12 April 1998) is a Welsh rugby union player who plays for Dragons as a wing.

Goodchild made his debut for the Dragons in 2016 having previously played for the Dragons academy, Cross Keys RFC and Garndiffaith RFC.

References

External links 
Dragons profile
itsrugby.co.uk profile

Welsh rugby union players
Rugby union wings
Dragons RFC players
Living people
1998 births
Ampthill RUFC players